Lights Out! is a studio album by saxophonist Jackie McLean, his debut on Prestige Records. It was recorded in 1956 and released the same year as PRLP 7035. The album was reissued on CD in 1990 (as Original Jazz Classics OJCCD-426-2/Prestige P-7035). It was re-issued on 180 gram vinyl by Analogue Productions in 2012. It features McLean in a quintet with trumpeter Donald Byrd, pianist Elmo Hope, bassist Doug Watkins and drummer Art Taylor.

Reception
Reviewing the 2012 vinyl re-issue, Joseph Neff said of the title track:
But if not a masterwork, it does have plenty to recommend, opening with the title cut, an extended slow blues that gives the horns and Hope's piano ample space for soloing, and while casual in intent the ambience is also quite far from uninspired. The first thing heard is Watkins, his fingers providing a big loping bedrock that never falters throughout the song’s thirteen minutes. Taylor rides with him and accents with skill, never becoming too busy. And all three solo flights are quite successful in working up the sophisticated soul-grease that was just starting to define the hard-bop form at the time this recording was made. I especially enjoy how towards the end McLean's and Byrd's horns tangle around in loose dialogue, offering summation after Hope finishes his superb solo.

Track listing 
"Lights Out" (Jackie McLean) – 13:00
"Up" (McLean) – 4:47
"Lorraine" (Donald Byrd) – 6:26
"A Foggy Day" (George Gershwin, Ira Gershwin) – 6:24
"Kerplunk" (Byrd) – 8:51
"Inding" (McLean) – 6:30

Personnel
Jackie McLean – alto saxophone
Donald Byrd – trumpet
Elmo Hope – piano
Doug Watkins – bass
Art Taylor – drums

References

External links

1956 albums
Jackie McLean albums
Albums produced by Bob Weinstock
Prestige Records albums